The Lanterna Azzurra "stampede" was a fatal crowd crush that occurred on 8 December 2018 at the Lanterna Azzurra nightclub in Corinaldo, Marche, Italy. Six people were killed and 59 injured.

Incident
At the time of the event, there was a rap concert headlined by Sfera Ebbasta at the Lanterna Azzurra nightclub. A surge for the exits began at around 1:00 a.m., supposedly after someone sprayed an "irritant substance" into the crowd. At some point during the surge, a metal railing collapsed outside the nightclub, causing people to fall off a walkway and land on top of one another, leading to multiple deaths and injuries.

According to investigators and state radio, there were about 1,400 people inside at the time, even though the nightclub's maximum capacity was of 469. Approximately 600 tickets were scanned for entry, leaving it unclear whether hundreds of others had sneaked into the nightclub.

Casualties
Six people were killed: Emma Fabini, 14; Asia Nasoni, 14; Benedetta Vitali, 15; Mattia Orlandi, 15; Daniele Pongetti, 16; and Eleonora Girolimini, 39, who accompanying her 11 year old daughter to the event. 200 other people were injured, seven critically and five seriously.

Investigation
There were multiple reports that the surge was triggered by someone in the club spraying an "irritant substance". Investigators scouring the building announced the discovery of a pepper spray can on 9 December, but did not confirm if it was responsible for triggering a surge for the exits. On 10 December, police announced the arrest of a 16-year-old boy and gang member who was suspected of setting off pepper spray in the nightclub while trying to steal a gold necklace from a female concertgoer. Seven adults, including the club owners and concert organisers, were also held under investigation in relation to the stampede.

In March 2020, six men went on trial for manslaughter in Ancona, with the prosecution arguing that pepper spray was used to facilitate robbery. An additional person arrested on charges of receiving stolen goods and criminal association, agreed to a plea bargain before the trial.

Reactions
Interior Minister Matteo Salvini called for safety codes of public places to be rigorously investigated. Following this statement, two other nightclubs in Italy were shut down because of overcrowding. Sfera Ebbasta, the headliner for the concert, said in an Instagram post that he was saddened by the tragedy and announced his intent to suspend promotional events for the time being.

See also

References

December 2018 crimes in Europe
December 2018 events in Italy
Human stampedes in 2018
Human stampedes in Italy
Province of Ancona